Koulogon Habé or Koulogon Habbé is a small town and commune in the Cercle of Bankass in the Mopti Region of Mali. In 1998 the commune had a population of 9,189 and grew to 9,890 in 2004.

The municipality was created by Law No. 96-059 of 4 November 1996. The 9 villages in the commune are mainly populated by the Dogon and Fulani peoples.

Geograph
Located in the plain of Seno, the soils are sandy. Apart from some seasonal ponds during the rainy season, there is no perennial surface water and groundwater. The water at depth is barely exploited.

Sparse natural vegetation is composed by a few species such as balanza, plum tree, kapok tree, shea butter, tamarind, baobab, neem and acacia etc. In terms of wildlife, there are hares, squirrels, reptiles, partridges, hawks, storks, crows, etc.

Economy
Koulogon is located in the area called the Séno which, with a rainfall of 500 mm per year is conducive to the cultivation of millet. A portion of the crop is sold to merchants from Mopti and Burkinabe neighbours. Other crops are also present including groundnuts, cowpeas, sesame etc.). Due to soil depletion and declining rainfall, yields are declining.

Cattle is also an important industry in this commune, sheep, goats, donkeys, horses, pigs and poultry ad common.

Education
The municipality has two community schools (at Koulogon and Soguina), three medersas (at Koulogon, Soguina and Anamoïla) and three literacy centers (at Soguina, Koulogon and Anamoïla).

References

Communes of Mopti Region